The 1994 Austral-Asia Cup was a cricket tournament held in Sharjah, UAE, between April 13–22, 1994. Six national teams took part: Australia, India, New Zealand, Pakistan, Sri Lanka and United Arab Emirates.

The teams were divided into two groups of three who played each other, round robin, with the winner and runner-up of each group progressing to the semi-finals.

Pakistan won the tournament, defeating India, in the final. Australia and New Zealand reached the semi-finals, while Sri Lanka and United Arab Emirates were knocked out in the first round.
 
The tournament was sponsored by Pepsi.

Group stage

Group A

Group B

Knockout stage

Semi-finals

Final

See also
 Austral-Asia Cup

References

 Cricinfo tournament page
 Cricket Archive tournament page
 
 

International cricket competitions from 1991–92 to 1994
Austral-Asia Cup, 1994
1994 in Emirati sport
International cricket competitions in the United Arab Emirates